Benkt Rudolf Norelius (26 April 1886 – 30 November 1974) was a Swedish gymnast. He was a member of the Swedish team that won the gold medal in the Swedish system event at the 1912 Summer Olympics.

References

1886 births
1974 deaths
Swedish male artistic gymnasts
Gymnasts at the 1912 Summer Olympics
Olympic gymnasts of Sweden
Olympic gold medalists for Sweden
Olympic medalists in gymnastics
Medalists at the 1912 Summer Olympics
Sportspeople from Umeå